James Edward Hasty (born May 23, 1965) is a former professional American football cornerback who played in the National Football League (NFL) for the New York Jets, the Kansas City Chiefs, and the Oakland Raiders from 1988 to 2001.

Career

Football career
Hasty was selected in the third round of the 1988 NFL Draft (74th overall) by the Jets and was selected to the Pro Bowl in 1997 and 1999. He starred at the cornerback position at Washington State University. Known for his aggressive bump and run coverage, Hasty teamed with Dale Carter to form one of the league's top cornerbacking duos while with the Chiefs.

After football
From 2001 to 2004, Hasty was an assistant football coach for Bellevue High School who won 4 straight State Championships in the state of Washington. In 2010, he rejoined the coaching staff of the Bellevue Wolverines as a defensive backs coach. The Bellevue Defensive Coordinator was headed by Chris Beak who had served in various coaching duties in the NFL himself. In September 2010, Chris Beak re-entered the NFL as an offensive assistant coach with the San Francisco 49ers. This led to his taking over as the Bellevue defensive coordinator, where he remained as of 2013.

He started working for ESPN as an NFL analyst on May 3, 2006, where he was also a college football analyst.

Personal life
Hasty is a member of the Omega Psi Phi fraternity while attending Washington State University.

Hasty's sons, J.R. and Tyler, played football at Bellevue High School. J.R. played football at the University of Washington and Central Washington University but was dismissed from each football program.  Tyler redshirted the 2012 football season at Oregon State University but was dismissed from the team following an arrest.

References

1965 births
Living people
African-American players of American football
American football cornerbacks
Washington State Cougars football players
Central Washington Wildcats football players
New York Jets players
Kansas City Chiefs players
Oakland Raiders players
Players of American football from Seattle
American Conference Pro Bowl players
College football announcers
21st-century African-American people
20th-century African-American sportspeople